Rhabdophis callichroma, the Bavi keelback, is a keelback snake in the family Colubridae found in Vietnam and China.

References

Rhabdophis
Snakes of Southeast Asia
Reptiles of Vietnam
Reptiles of China
Reptiles described in 1934
Taxa named by René Léon Bourret